Giuseppe Civran (1629 – 17 May 1679) was a Roman Catholic prelate who served as Bishop of Vicenza (1660–1679).

Biography
Giuseppe Civran was born in Venice, Italy in 1629. On 21 June 1660, he was appointed during the papacy of Pope Innocent XI as Bishop of Vicenza. He served as Bishop of Vicenza until his death on 17 May 1679.

References

External links and additional sources
 (for Chronology of Bishops) 
 (for Chronology of Bishops) 

17th-century Italian Roman Catholic bishops
Bishops appointed by Pope Innocent XI
1629 births
1679 deaths